"Don't Hold the Wall" is a song recorded by American singer-songwriter Justin Timberlake for his third studio album, The 20/20 Experience (2013). It was written and produced by Timberlake, Timothy "Timbaland" Mosley and Jerome "J-Roc" Harmon, with additional writing from James Fauntleroy.

Background and production 
Timberlake started writing and recording for his third studio album in the "late part of May, first week in June" and concluded in July 2012. The project was produced in a span of 20 days. In August 2012, producer Jim Beanz reported that Timberlake started work on his new music project. However, at that time, shortly after the announcement, Timberlake's publicist revealed that there were no current plans for a new Timberlake album, affirming instead that Timberlake was working with Timbaland on songs for his upcoming project Shock Value III. Although, originally planned for release in October 2012, the album's date was postponed because of the singer's wedding with actress Jessica Biel. Timberlake's manager Johnny Wright stated that although in the project were involved artists who are also primarily and Timberlake's friends it was tough keeping the album a secret, making them use codenames for the project. The album was released on March 15, 2013, under the title The 20/20 Experience.

"Don't Hold the Wall" was written by Timberlake, Timothy "Timbaland" Mosley, Jerome "J-Roc" Harmon and James Fauntleroy. The song was produced by Timbaland, Timberlake and Harmon. Timberlake arranged and produced his vocals, which were recorded at Larabee Studios in North Hollywood, California. Harmon provided keyboards for the song, while Elliot Ives played the guitar. The song was engineered by Chris Godbey, with assistance from Alejandro Baima. The song was mixed by Jimmy Douglass, Godbey and Timberlake at Larabee Studios.

Composition and lyrical interpretation 
"Don't Hold the Wall" is a R&B song with a length of seven minutes and ten seconds. According to Joey Guerra of the Houston Chronicle the song "rides a hypnotic, sensual groove". The song contains tribal chants and "oozing" vocal samples. Tribal drums, rainsticks, "spacious drums" and a "pseudo-Indian" beat are also present.

"Don't Hold the Wall" begins a "gorgeous sounding" The Beach Boys-like chorus, according to David Meller of MusicOMH. Jean Bentley of Hollywood.com compared the a cappella introduction of the song to that of Timberlake's former boy band, 'NSYNC. The song then shifts into a mix of hip hop, Bollywood and Bhangra music. Four minutes and twenty seconds into the song, "Don't Hold the Wall" transcends "darker, more muscular structure", according to Billboards Jason Lipshutz. The song concludes with drum and bass loops and vocoder backing vocals.

Lyrically, the song sees Timberlake in pursuit of a woman in a club, "something he's undoubtedly had little trouble doing over the years". Timberlake commands the object of his affection to "give in" to her "physical impulses". Timbaland chants, "Dance... Don't hold the wall", in a voice that sounds "as if it is coming through a broken phone receiver", according to Allan Raible of ABC News. According to Lipshutz, Timbaland's production on the song is "the star" of The 20/20 Experience. He wrote that "there are so many things happening" in the song that it takes five listens just to "process them".

Critical response 
Sarah Dean of The Huffington Post called "Don't Hold the Wall" one of the "strongest songs" on The 20/20 Experience. She cited the song as being the "Chop Me Up" of FutureSex/LoveSounds and the "Rock Your Body" of Justified "funked up" for The 20/20 Experience. Allan Raible of ABC News called the song a "sparse, hand-clap jam" that does not warrant its seven-minute length, even with its "marginally interesting breakdown".

Credits and personnel 
Credits adapted from the liner notes of The 20/20 Experience.
Locations
Vocals recorded and mixed at Larrabee Studios, North Hollywood, California
Personnel

Timothy "Timbaland" Mosley – producer, songwriter
Justin Timberlake – Mixer, producer, songwriter, vocal producer, vocal arranger
Jerome "J-Roc" Harmon – keyboards, producer, songwriter
James Fauntleroy – songwriter
Chris Godbey – engineer, mixer
Jimmy Douglass – mixer
Alejandro Baima – assistant engineer
Elliot Ives – guitar

Charts

References 

2013 songs
Justin Timberlake songs
Songs written by Timbaland
Songs written by Justin Timberlake
Songs written by Jerome "J-Roc" Harmon
Songs written by James Fauntleroy
Song recordings produced by Timbaland
Song recordings produced by Justin Timberlake
Song recordings produced by Jerome "J-Roc" Harmon